Turks & Caicos is a 2014 political thriller television film, written and directed for the BBC by the playwright David Hare. It follows Page Eight, which aired on BBC Two in August 2011 and is followed by Salting the Battlefield.

Plot
Following the events of Page Eight, ex-MI5 officer Johnny Worricker (Bill Nighy) is in hiding on the Turks and Caicos Islands. A seemingly chance encounter with Curtis Pelissier (Christopher Walken) leads Johnny to a dinner with several shady American businessmen who comprise a company called Gladstone. The following morning, one of the businessmen is found dead on the beach in suspicious circumstances; Melanie Fall (Winona Ryder), a Gladstone liaison, seems to know more than she lets on. When Pelissier reveals himself to be a CIA covert operative who knows Johnny's true identity, Johnny desperately cuts a deal: he will help Pelissier with the investigation of Gladstone in exchange for his silence about his location.

The remaining businessmen claim to be on the islands for an international financial colloquium. Johnny learns they have a link to London private equity mogul Stirling Rogers (Rupert Graves), who is also director of a charitable foundation called The Bridge. Johnny links The Bridge to his old nemesis, Prime Minister Alec Beasley (Ralph Fiennes). Johnny's old girlfriend, former MI5 analyst Margot Tyrell (Helena Bonham-Carter), is now a financial expert in London who is working with Rogers. He calls on old acquaintance Rollo Maverley (Ewen Bremner) to contact Margot and extract information regarding The Bridge.

Before long, Johnny learns the extent of Gladstone's activities: they are "quartermasters" who have been overcharging the U.S. government for the construction of black site torture camps. When Margot and Rogers arrive on the island, Johnny quickly makes his presence known and, along with Pelissier, sets up a high-stakes meeting with the concerned parties. Amid tense negotiations, Johnny — with the help of Margot's information — secures a deal between the CIA and Gladstone, and reveals a link between the company's excess funds and Beasley's ambitions. Johnny is double-crossed by Pelissier and is forced to flee the islands. He and Margot reconcile, and — with the help of local policeman Carroll — evade the CIA long enough to escape via boat. The two now go on the run, knowing their lives will never be the same again.

Cast
 Bill Nighy as Johnny Worricker, former MI5 analyst
 Helena Bonham Carter as Margot Tyrrell, Johnny's ex-girlfriend
 Rupert Graves as Stirling Rogers, director of 'The Bridge' foundation
 Ralph Fiennes as Prime Minister Alec Beasley
 Ewen Bremner as Rollo Maverley
 James McArdle as Ted Finch
 Winona Ryder as Melanie Fall, Financial PR
 Christopher Walken as Curtis Pelissier, a CIA agent on the islands
 Dylan Baker as Gary Bethwaite
 Meredith Eaton as Clare Clovis, an accountant for Gladstone
 Zach Grenier as Dido Parsons
 Julie Hewlett as Natalie Helier
 James Naughton as Frank Church
 Malik Yoba as Jim Carroll, a detective with the Royal Turks & Caicos Islands Police Force

Production
Filming took place in London and the Turks and Caicos Islands. Turks & Caicos is a Carnival Films, Heyday Films, Beaglepug and Masterpiece co-production in association with NBCUniversal for BBC Television.

References

External links
 
 
 
 Turks & Caicos media pack at BBC.co.uk

British spy films
British television films
American spy films
American political films
Films directed by David Hare
British political films
Crime television films
Action television films
American thriller television films
2014 in British television
Heyday Films films
Spy television films
MI5 in fiction
2014 films
2010s English-language films
2010s American films
2010s British films